Dan Pryor (born 14 April 1988) is a New Zealand rugby union player who currently plays as a loose forward for the San Diego Legion of Major League Rugby (MLR). He also plays for the Munakata Sanix Blues in the Japanese Top League.

Early career

He attended Auckland Grammar School in his home city and played first XV rugby while there. After graduation he began studying towards a degree in business and advertising at the Auckland University of Technology while playing his club rugby for Grammar TEC with whom he won the Gallaher Shield in 2013. He also spent time with the Auckland academy before departing the Auckland club scene in 2014 and joining Marist in the Northland club rugby competition.

Senior career

He started out his senior career playing for the Northland Taniwha during the 2010 ITM Cup and instantly made himself a regular in the side, scoring 3 tries in 8 starts during his debut season of provincial rugby.   The Taniwha are traditionally one of the weakest provinces in New Zealand's senior domestic competition and have played in the Championship, the second tier, since the competition was last rejigged in 2011.   A career highlight for Pryor and his side was the 2014 ITM Cup where a 3rd-place finish on the Championship log ensured they would appear in the playoffs.   Unfortunately his 57th minute try against  in the semi-finals wasn't enough to inspire his side to victory and they eventually went down 26–21.

After the highs of the 2014 campaign came the lows of the 2015 and 2016 seasons.   2015 saw Northland lose all 10 of their regular season games to finish last on the log and this was also where they would finish in 2016, despite improved performances, a solitary win from 10 games was all they could show for their efforts.   Pryor featured 7 times and contributed 1 try in 2015, however injury restricted him to just two appearances in 2016.

Super Rugby

Following some impressive displays as one of the senior members of a young and inexperienced Northland Taniwha side during the 2014 New Zealand domestic season, he was named in the Dunedin-based  squad ahead of the 2015 Super Rugby season. Pryor played 17 times out of a possible 19 and contributed 3 tries, however an elbow injury ruled him out of the semi-final and final.

Tony Brown replaced the -bound Jamie Joseph as the Highlanders head coach ahead of the 2017 Super Rugby season and he opted to retain Pryor in the squad for his first season in charge.

International

Pryor was named in the Māori All Blacks squad ahead of the 2014 end-of-year rugby union internationals and debuted in a 61–21 win over Japan in Kobe, coming on to the field as a 49th minute replacement for future Highlanders teammate Elliot Dixon.   The following week the same two sides would meet, this time in Tokyo.   Pryor started the match in the number 6 jersey and was to score the decisive try in the final minute of the match to secure a dramatic 20–18 win for his side.

Career Honours

Highlanders

Super Rugby - 2015

Super Rugby statistics

References

1988 births
New Zealand rugby union players
New Zealand Māori rugby union players
Rugby union flankers
Rugby union number eights
Northland rugby union players
Blues (Super Rugby) players
Highlanders (rugby union) players
Māori All Blacks players
Rugby union players from Auckland
Ngāti Awa people
Ngāti Pikiao people
Ngāti Rangitihi people
People educated at Auckland Grammar School
Auckland University of Technology alumni
Living people
Sunwolves players
Munakata Sanix Blues players
San Diego Legion players